The 1812–13 United States House of Representatives elections were held on various dates in various states between August 3, 1812 and April 30, 1813. Each state set its own date for its elections to the House of Representatives before the first session of the 13th United States Congress convened on May 24, 1813. They coincided with James Madison being re-elected president.

With the addition of the new state of Louisiana's at-large seat, along with the 39-seat gain as a result of the congressional reapportionment based on the 1810 United States Census, the size of the House increased to 182 seats. Most relative population growth was in the West.

After America's entry into the War of 1812 against Britain, the Democratic-Republican and Federalist parties maintained pro-war and anti-war positions, respectively. Democratic-Republican representatives supported by voters in agrarian regions and Southern and Western states promoted war, asserting that Britain had violated American sovereignty and that despite Britain's strength, war was a manageable risk. Federalists and their supporters in New England and more densely populated Eastern districts opposed the war, citing likely damage to American trade and infrastructure.

This election saw significant voter support shift to the declining Federalists for the last time, almost entirely in New England, New York, and New Jersey. Despite this shift, Federalists did not approach national political recovery, House control, or meaningful policy influence.

Election summaries 
Following the 1810 census, the House was reapportioned, adding 39 new seats.

Special elections 

There were special elections in 1812 and 1813 to the 12th United States Congress and 13th United States Congress.

Special elections are sorted by date then district.

12th Congress 

|-
! 
| Barzillai Gannett
|  | Democratic-Republican
| 1808
|  | Incumbent resigned in 1812.New member elected April 6, 1812.Democratic-Republican hold.Successor seated June 3, 1812.Successor later lost re-election, see below.
| nowrap | 

|-
! 
| Howell Cobb
|  | Democratic-Republican
| 1806
|  | Incumbent resigned before October 1812 to accept a captain's commission in the U.S. Army.New member elected October 5, 1812.Democratic-Republican hold.Successor seated November 27, 1812.Successor also elected the same day to the next term, see below.
| nowrap | 

|-
! 
| Robert L. Livingston
|  | Federalist
| 1808
|  | Incumbent resigned to accept commission as a lieutenant colonel.New member elected December 15–17, 1812.Federalist hold.Successor seated January 29, 1813.Successor also elected the same day to the next term, see below.
| nowrap | 

|-
! 
| Thomas Blount
|  | Democratic-Republican
| 17931798 18041808 (Lost)1810
|  | Incumbent died February 7, 1812.New member elected January 11, 1813.Democratic-Republican hold.Successor seated January 30, 1813.Successor later re-elected, see below.
| nowrap | 

|}

13th Congress 

|-
! 
| John Smilie
|  | Democratic-Republican
| 17921794 1798
|  | Incumbent/member-elect died December 30, 1812.New member elected February 16, 1813.Democratic-Republican hold.Successor seated May 24, 1813.
| nowrap | 

|-
! 
| John S. Edwards
|  | Federalist
| 1812
|  | Member-elect died February 22, 1813.New member elected April 20, 1813.Democratic-Republican gain.Successor seated June 8, 1813.
| nowrap | 

|-
! 
| William Dowse
|  | Federalist
| 1812
|  | Member-elect died February 18, 1813.New member elected April 27–29, 1813.Federalist hold.Successor seated June 21, 1813.Election was later successfully challenged by Isaac Williams Jr. (Democratic-Republican).
| nowrap | 

|-
! 
| John Simpson
|  | Democratic-Republican
| 1812
|  | Member-elect died January 22, 1813.New member elected April 29, 1813.Democratic-Republican hold.Successor seated May 28, 1813.
| nowrap | 

|-
! 
| Abner Lacock
|  | Democratic-Republican
| 1810
|  | Incumbent/member-elect resigned March 3, 1813, to become U.S. Senator.New member elected May 4, 1813.Democratic-Republican hold.Successor seated May 28, 1813.
| nowrap | 

|-
! 
| Duncan McArthur
|  | Democratic-Republican
| 1812
|  | Member-elect resigned April 5, 1813, to stay in the state militia.New member elected May 10, 1813.Democratic-Republican hold.Successor seated June 15, 1813.
| nowrap | 

|-
! 
| Robert Whitehill
|  | Democratic-Republican
| 1805 
|  | Member-elect died April 8, 1813.New member elected May 11, 1813.Democratic-Republican hold.Successor seated May 28, 1813.
| nowrap | 

|-
! 
| John Gloninger
|  | Federalist
| 1812
|  | Incumbent resigned August 2, 1813.New member elected October 12, 1813.Democratic-Republican gain.Successor seated December 6, 1813.
| nowrap | 

|-
! 
| John M. Hyneman
|  | Democratic-Republican
| 1810
|  | Incumbent resigned August 2, 1813.New member elected October 12, 1813.Democratic-Republican hold.Successor seated December 6, 1813.
| nowrap | 

|-
! 
| William W. Bibb
|  | Democratic-Republican
| 1806
|  | Incumbent resigned after election as U.S. Senator.New member elected December 13, 1813.Democratic-Republican hold.Successor seated February 7, 1814.
| nowrap | 

|-
! 
| Egbert Benson
|  | Federalist
| 17891793 1812
|  | Incumbent resigned August 2, 1813.New member elected December 28–30, 1813.Democratic-Republican gain.Successor seated January 22, 1814.
| nowrap | 

|}

Connecticut 

Connecticut elected its members September 21, 1812. Its apportionment was unchanged after the 1810 census.

|-
! rowspan=7 | 
| Benjamin Tallmadge
|  | Federalist
| 1801 
| Incumbent re-elected.
| rowspan=7 nowrap | 

|-
| Timothy Pitkin
|  | Federalist
| 1805 
| Incumbent re-elected.

|-
| John Davenport
|  | Federalist
| 1798
| Incumbent re-elected.

|-
| Lewis B. Sturges
|  | Federalist
| 1805 
| Incumbent re-elected.

|-
| Jonathan O. Moseley
|  | Federalist
| 1804
| Incumbent re-elected.

|-
| Epaphroditus Champion
|  | Federalist
| 1806
| Incumbent re-elected.

|-
| Lyman Law
|  | Federalist
| 1810
| Incumbent re-elected.

|}

Delaware 

Delaware gained a seat after the 1810 census, and chose to elect both seats on a general ticket. The ten years between 1813 and 1823 were the only time when Delaware was represented by more than one Representative, and is one of only three states (the other two being Alaska and Wyoming) that have never been divided into districts.

Delaware elected its members October 6, 1812.

|-
! rowspan=2 | 
| Henry M. Ridgely
|  | Federalist
| 1810
| Incumbent re-elected.
| rowspan=2 nowrap | 

|-
| colspan=3 | None (Seat created)
|  | New seat.New member elected.Federalist gain.

|}

Georgia 

Georgia gained two seats after the 1810 census.

Georgia elected its members October 5, 1812.

|-
! rowspan=6 | 
| William W. Bibb
|  | Democratic-Republican
| 1806
| Incumbent re-elected.
| rowspan=6 nowrap | 

|-
| George M. Troup
|  | Democratic-Republican
| 1806
| Incumbent re-elected.

|-
| Howell Cobb
|  | Democratic-Republican
| 1806
|  | Incumbent resigned before October 1812 to accept a captain's commission in the U.S. Army.New member elected.Democratic-Republican hold.Successor also elected the same day to finish the current term, see above.

|-
| Bolling Hall
|  | Democratic-Republican
| 1810
| Incumbent re-elected.

|-
| colspan=3 | None (Seat created)
|  | New seat.New member elected.Democratic-Republican gain.

|-
| colspan=3 | None (Seat created)
|  | New seat.New member elected.Democratic-Republican gain.

|}

Illinois Territory 
See Non-voting delegates, below.

Indiana Territory 
See Non-voting delegates, below.

Kentucky 

Kentucky gained four seats after the 1810 census.

Georgia elected its members August 3, 1812.

|-
! 
| colspan=3 | None (District created)
|  | New seat.New member elected.Democratic-Republican gain.
| nowrap | 

|-
! 
| Henry Clay
|  | Democratic-Republican
| 1810
| Incumbent re-elected.
| nowrap | 

|-
! 
| Richard M. Johnson
|  | Democratic-Republican
| 1806
| Incumbent re-elected.
| nowrap | 

|-
! 
| Joseph Desha
|  | Democratic-Republican
| 1806
| Incumbent re-elected.
| nowrap | 

|-
! 
| Anthony New
|  | Democratic-Republican
| 1810
|  | Incumbent retired.New member elected.Democratic-Republican hold.
| nowrap | 

|-
! 
| colspan=3 | None (District created)
|  | New seat.New member elected.Democratic-Republican gain.
| nowrap | 

|-
! 
| Samuel McKee
|  | Democratic-Republican
| 1808
| Incumbent re-elected.
| nowrap | 

|-
! 
| Stephen Ormsby
|  | Democratic-Republican
| 1810
|  | Incumbent lost re-election.New member elected.Democratic-Republican hold.Successor died January 22, 1813, leading to a special election see above.
| nowrap | 

|-
! 
| colspan=3 | None (District created)
|  | New seat.New member elected.Democratic-Republican gain.
| nowrap | 

|-
! 
| colspan=3 | None (District created)
|  | New seat.New member elected.Democratic-Republican gain.
| nowrap | 

|}

Louisiana 

Louisiana held its election for the 13th Congress September 28–30, 1812, at the same time as the election for the 12th Congress, with nearly-identical results.

12th Congress 

|-
! 
| colspan=3 | None (District created)
|  | New district, seat created.New member elected September 28–30, 1812.Democratic-Republican gain.New member seated December 23, 1812.Member also elected the same day to the next term, see below.
| nowrap | 

|}

13th Congress 

|-
! 
| colspan=3 | None (District created)
|  | New district, seat created.New member elected September 28–30, 1812.Democratic-Republican gain.Successor elected the same day to finish the current term, see above.
| nowrap | 

|}

Maryland 

Maryland's apportionment was unchanged. It elected its members October 12, 1812.

|-
! 
| Philip Stuart
|  | Federalist
| 1810
| Incumbent re-elected.
| nowrap | 

|-
! 
| Joseph Kent
|  | Democratic-Republican
| 1810
| Incumbent re-elected.
| nowrap | 

|-
! 
| Philip Barton Key
|  | Federalist
| 1806
|  | Incumbent retired.New member elected.Federalist hold.
| nowrap | 

|-
! 
| Samuel Ringgold
|  | Democratic-Republican
| 1810
| Incumbent re-elected.
| nowrap | 

|-
! rowspan=2 | 
| Alexander McKim
|  | Democratic-Republican
| 1808
| Incumbent re-elected.
| rowspan=2 nowrap | 

|-
| Peter Little
|  | Democratic-Republican
| 1810
|  | Incumbent lost re-election.New member elected.Democratic-Republican hold.

|-
! 
| Stevenson Archer
|  | Democratic-Republican
| 1811 
| Incumbent re-elected.
| nowrap | 

|-
! 
| Robert Wright
|  | Democratic-Republican
| 1810 
| Incumbent re-elected.
| nowrap | 

|-
! 
| Charles Goldsborough
|  | Federalist
| 1804
| Incumbent re-elected.
| nowrap | 

|}

Massachusetts 

Massachusetts gained three seats after the 1810 census, all of which were added to the District of Maine.

|-
! 
| Josiah Quincy
|  | Federalist
| 1804
|  | Incumbent retired.New member elected.Federalist hold.
| nowrap | 

|-
! 
| William Reed
|  | Federalist
| 1810
| Incumbent re-elected.
| nowrap | 

|-
! 
| Leonard White
|  | Federalist
| 1810
|  | Incumbent retired.New member elected.Federalist hold.
| nowrap | 

|-
! 
| William M. Richardson
|  | Democratic-Republican
| 1811 
| Incumbent re-elected.
| nowrap | 

|-
! 
| William Ely
|  | Federalist
| 1804
| Incumbent re-elected.
| nowrap | 

|-
! 
| Samuel Taggart
|  | Federalist
| 1803
| Incumbent re-elected.
| nowrap | 

|-
! 
| Charles Turner Jr.
|  | Democratic-Republican
| 1808
|  | Incumbent lost re-election.New member elected.Federalist gain.
| nowrap | 

|-
! 
| Isaiah L. Green
|  | Democratic-Republican
| 1810
|  | Incumbent lost re-election.New member elected.Federalist gain.
| nowrap | 

|-
! 
| Laban Wheaton
|  | Federalist
| 1808
| Incumbent re-elected.
| nowrap | 

|-
! 
| Elijah Brigham
|  | Federalist
| 1810
| Incumbent re-elected.
| nowrap | 

|-
! 
| Abijah Bigelow
|  | Federalist
| 1810
| Incumbent re-elected.
| nowrap | 

|-
! 
| Ezekiel Bacon
|  | Democratic-Republican
| 1807 
|  | Incumbent retired.New member elected.Federalist gain.
| nowrap | 

|-
! 
| Ebenezer Seaver
|  | Democratic-Republican
| 1802
|  | Incumbent lost re-election.New member elected.Federalist gain.
| nowrap | 

|-
! 
| Richard Cutts
|  | Democratic-Republican
| 1801
|  | Incumbent lost re-election.New member elected.Federalist gain.
| nowrap | 

|-
! 
| William Widgery
|  | Democratic-Republican
| 1810
|  | Incumbent lost re-election.New member elected.Federalist gain.
| nowrap | 

|-
! 
| colspan=3 | None (District created)
|  | New seat.New member elected.Federalist gain.
| nowrap | 

|-
! 
| colspan=3 | None (District created)
|  | New seat.New member elected.Democratic-Republican gain.
| nowrap | 

|-
! 
| Francis Carr
|  | Democratic-Republican
| 1812 
|  | Incumbent lost re-election.New member elected.Federalist gain.
| nowrap | 

|-
! 
| colspan=3 | None (District created)
|  | New seat.New member elected.Democratic-Republican gain.
| First ballot :James Parker (Democratic-Republican) 49.3%Thomas Rice (Federalist) 49.0%Others 1.7%Second ballot :nowrap | 

|-
! 
| colspan=3 | None (District created)
|  | New seat.New member elected.Democratic-Republican gain.
| nowrap | 

|}

Mississippi Territory 
See Non-voting delegates, below.

Missouri Territory 
See Non-voting delegates, below.

New Hampshire 

New Hampshire gained one seat after the 1810 census. Its elections were held August 31, 1812.

|-
! rowspan=6 | 
| Josiah Bartlett Jr.
|  | Democratic-Republican
| 1810
|  | Incumbent retired.New member elected.Federalist gain.
| rowspan=6 nowrap | 

|-
| Samuel Dinsmoor
|  | Democratic-Republican
| 1810
|  | Incumbent lost re-election.New member elected.Federalist gain.

|-
| Obed Hall
|  | Democratic-Republican
| 1811
|  | Incumbent retired.New member elected.Federalist gain.

|-
| John Adams Harper
|  | Democratic-Republican
| 1811
|  | Incumbent lost re-election.New member elected.Federalist gain.

|-
| George Sullivan
|  | Federalist
| 1811
|  | Incumbent retired.New member elected.Federalist hold.

|-
| colspan=3 | None (Seat created)
|  | New seat.New member elected.Federalist gain.

|}

New Jersey 

New Jersey kept its delegation at six seats but changed from electing its Representatives on a statewide general ticket to using three plural districts of two seats each. These districts were used only for the 1812 election, and   These districts were used only for the 1812 electionThese districts were used only for the 1812 electionthe state returned to using a single at-large district in 1814. This was only the second time that New Jersey used districts (the first being in 1798).

There was a statewide at-large election held in November 1812, that was invalidated: 

|-
! rowspan=2 | 
| Lewis Condict
|  | Democratic-Republican
| 1810
| Incumbent re-elected.
| rowspan=2 nowrap | 

|-
| Adam Boyd
|  | Democratic-Republican
| 18031804 1808 
|  | Incumbent lost re-election.New member elected.Democratic-Republican hold.

|-
! rowspan=2 | 
| James Morgan
|  | Democratic-Republican
| 1810
|  | Incumbent lost re-election.New member elected.Federalist gain.
| rowspan=2 nowrap | 

|-
| George C. Maxwell
|  | Democratic-Republican
| 1810
|  | Incumbent lost re-election.New member elected.Federalist gain.

|-
! rowspan=2 | 
| Thomas Newbold
|  | Democratic-Republican
| 1806
|  | Incumbent lost re-election.New member elected.Federalist gain.
| rowspan=2 nowrap | 

|-
| Jacob Hufty
|  | Democratic-Republican
| 1808
|  | Incumbent re-elected as a Federalist.Federalist gain.

|}

New York 

Ten seats were added after the 1810 census, bringing New York's representation to 27, the largest of any state at the time. New York would remain the state with the most members until surpassed by California in the 1970 census. There were two separate House of Representatives elections in 1812. The first was held in April 1812 for an un-reapportioned 17 representatives. This election was subsequently declared void and a new election was held on December 15–17, 1812, in which only three incumbents ran and two of whom were re-elected. New York thereby lost 4 Democratic-Republicans and gained 14 Federalists.

|-
! rowspan=2 | 
| Ebenezer Sage
|  | Democratic-Republican
| 1810
| Incumbent re-elected.Results of the election were contested but no action was taken by the House.
| rowspan=2 nowrap | 

|-
| colspan=3 | None (Second seat created)
|  | New seat.New member elected.Democratic-Republican gain.

|-
! rowspan=2 | 
| Samuel L. Mitchill
|  | Democratic-Republican
| 1810
|  | Incumbent retired.New member elected.Federalist gain.
| rowspan=2 nowrap | 

|-
| William Paulding Jr.
|  | Democratic-Republican
| 1810
|  | Incumbent retired.New member elected.Federalist gain.

|-
! 
| Pierre Van Cortlandt Jr.
|  | Democratic-Republican
| 1810
|  | Incumbent lost re-election.New member elected.Democratic-Republican hold.
| nowrap | 

|-
! 
| James Emott
|  | Federalist
| 1808
|  | Incumbent retired.New member elected.Federalist hold.
| nowrap | 

|-
! rowspan=2 | 
| Robert L. Livingston
|  | Federalist
| 1808
|  | Incumbent resigned May 6, 1812, to accept a commission as a lieutenant colonel.Federalist hold.Successor also elected the same day to finish the term, see above.
| rowspan=2 nowrap | 
|-
| Thomas B. Cooke
|  | Democratic-Republican
| 1810
|  | Incumbent retired.New member elected.Democratic-Republican loss.

|-
! 
| Asa Fitch
|  | Federalist
| 1810
|  | Incumbent retired.New member elected.Democratic-Republican gain.
| nowrap | 

|-
! 
| Harmanus Bleecker
|  | Federalist
| 1810
|  | Incumbent retired.New member elected.Democratic-Republican gain.
| nowrap | 

|-
! 
| Benjamin Pond
|  | Democratic-Republican
| 1810
|  | Incumbent retired.New member elected.Federalist gain.
| nowrap | 

|-
! 
| Thomas Sammons
|  | Democratic-Republican
| 1808
|  | Incumbent retired.New member elected.Federalist gain.
| nowrap | 

|-
! 
| Silas Stow
|  | Democratic-Republican
| 1810
|  | Incumbent retired.New member elected.Federalist gain.
| nowrap | 

|-
! 
| Thomas R. Gold
|  | Federalist
| 1808
|  | Incumbent retired.New member elected.Democratic-Republican gain.
| nowrap | 

|-
! rowspan=2 | 
| Arunah Metcalf
|  | Democratic-Republican
| 1810
|  | Incumbent retired.New member elected.Federalist gain.
| rowspan=2 nowrap | 

|-
| colspan=3 | None (Second seat created)
|  | New seat.New member elected.Federalist gain.

|-
! 
| Uri Tracy
|  | Democratic-Republican
| 1808
|  | Incumbent retired.New member elected.Federalist gain.
| nowrap | 

|-
! 
| colspan=3 | None (District created)
|  | New seat.New member elected.Federalist gain.
| nowrap | 

|-
! rowspan=2 | 
| Peter B. Porter
|  | Democratic-Republican
| 1808
|  | Incumbent retired.New member elected.Federalist gain.
| rowspan=2 nowrap | 

|-
| colspan=3 | None (second seat created)
|  | New seat.New member elected.Federalist gain.

|-
! 
| colspan=3 | None (District created)
|  | New seat.New member elected.Federalist gain.
| nowrap | 

|-
! 
| colspan=3 | None (District created)
|  | New seat.New member elected.Federalist gain.
| nowrap | 

|-
! 
| colspan=3 | None (District created)
|  | New seat.New member elected.Federalist gain.
| nowrap | 

|-
! 
| colspan=3 | None (District created)
|  | New seat.New member elected.Federalist gain.
| nowrap | 

|-
! rowspan=2 | 
| Daniel Avery
|  | Democratic-Republican
| 1810
| Incumbent re-elected.
| rowspan=2 nowrap | 

|-
| colspan=3 | None (Second seat created)
|  | New seat.New member elected.Democratic-Republican gain.

|-
! rowspan=2 | 
| colspan=3 | None (District created)
|  | New seat.New member elected.Federalist gain.
| rowspan=2 nowrap | 

|-
| colspan=3 | None (Second seat created)
|  | New seat.New member elected.Federalist gain.

|}

North Carolina 

North Carolina gained one representative as a result of the census of 1810. Its elections were held April 30, 1813, after the term began but before Congress's first meeting.

|-
! 
| Lemuel Sawyer
|  | Democratic-Republican
| 1806
|  | Incumbent lost re-election.New member elected.Democratic-Republican hold.
| nowrap | 

|-
! 
| Willis Alston
|  | Democratic-Republican
| 1798
| Incumbent re-elected.
| nowrap | 

|-
! 
| William Kennedy
|  | Democratic-Republican
| 18031813 
| Incumbent re-elected.
| nowrap | 

|-
! 
| William Blackledge
|  | Democratic-Republican
| 18031810
|  | Incumbent lost re-election.New member elected.Federalist gain.
| nowrap | 

|-
! 
| William R. King
|  | Democratic-Republican
| 1810
| Incumbent re-elected.
| nowrap | 

|-
! 
| Nathaniel Macon
|  | Democratic-Republican
| 1791
| Incumbent re-elected.
| nowrap | 

|-
! 
| Archibald McBryde
|  | Federalist
| 1808
|  | Incumbent retired.New member elected.Federalist hold.
| nowrap | 

|-
! 
| Richard Stanford
|  | Democratic-Republican
| 1796
| Incumbent re-elected.
| nowrap | 

|-
! 
| James Cochran
|  | Democratic-Republican
| 1808
|  | Incumbent retired.New member elected.Democratic-Republican hold.
| nowrap | 

|-
! 
| Joseph Pearson
|  | Federalist
| 1808
| Incumbent re-elected.
| nowrap | 

|-
! 
| colspan=3 | None (District created)
|  | New seat.New member elected.Democratic-Republican gain.
| nowrap | 

|-
! 
| Israel Pickens
|  | Democratic-Republican
| 1810
| Incumbent re-elected.
| nowrap | 

|-
! 
| Meshack Franklin
|  | Democratic-Republican
| 1806
| Incumbent re-elected.
| nowrap | 

|}

Ohio 

Jeremiah Morrow (Democratic-Republican), who had served since Ohio achieved statehood in 1803, retired to run for U.S. Senator, so that all six seats were open. Its elections were held October 13, 1812.

|-
! 
| colspan=3 | None (District created)
|  | New seat.New member elected.Democratic-Republican gain.
| nowrap | 

|-
! 
| colspan=3 | None (District created)
|  | New seat.New member elected.Democratic-Republican gain.
| nowrap | 

|-
! 
| colspan=3 | None (District created)
|  | New seat.New member elected.Democratic-Republican gain.Successor resigned April 5, 1813, after the new Congress began but before it first met, leading to a special election, see above.
| nowrap | 

|-
! 
| colspan=3 | None (District created)
|  | New seat.New member elected.Democratic-Republican gain.
| nowrap | 

|-
! 
| colspan=3 | None (District created)
|  | New seat.New member elected.Democratic-Republican gain.
| nowrap | 

|-
! 
| colspan=3 | None (District created)
|  | New seat.New member elected.Democratic-Republican gain.
| nowrap | 

|}

That election was won by Reasin Beall.

Pennsylvania 

Pennsylvania gained five seats in the House of Representatives as a result of the census of 1810, which awarded it a total of 23 seats. Pennsylvania was re-districted into 15 districts, one with 4 seats, five with 2, and the remaining nine with 1 seat each. There were seven open seats for this election, five resulting from the increase in apportionment, and two resulting from the retirement of incumbents. Its elections were held October 13, 1812.

|-
! rowspan=4 | 
| Adam Seybert
|  | Democratic-Republican
| 1809 
| Incumbent re-elected.
| rowspan=4 nowrap | 

|-
| William Anderson
|  | Democratic-Republican
| 1808
| Incumbent re-elected.

|-
| James Milnor
|  | Federalist
| 1810
|  | Incumbent retired.New member elected.Democratic-Republican gain.

|-
| colspan=3 | None (Seat created)
|  | New seat.New member elected.Democratic-Republican gain.

|-
! rowspan=2 | 
| Roger Davis
|  | Democratic-Republican
| 1810
| Incumbent re-elected.
| rowspan=2 nowrap | 

|-
| Jonathan Roberts
|  | Democratic-Republican
| 1810
| Incumbent re-elected.

|-
! rowspan=2 | 
| Joseph Lefever
|  | Democratic-Republican
| 1810
|  | Incumbent retired.New member elected.Democratic-Republican hold.Successor later resigned, leading to a special election.
| rowspan=2 nowrap | 
|-
| colspan=3 | None (Seat created)
|  | New seat.New member elected.Federalist gain.Successor later resigned, leading to a special election.

|-
! 
| colspan=3 | None (Seat created)
|  | New seat.New member elected.Democratic-Republican gain.
| nowrap | 

|-
! rowspan=2 | 
| Robert Whitehill
|  | Democratic-Republican
| 1805 
| Incumbent re-elected.
| rowspan=2 nowrap | 

|-
| William Crawford
|  | Democratic-Republican
| 1808
| Incumbent re-elected.

|-
! rowspan=2 | 
| Robert Brown
|  | Democratic-Republican
| 1798 
| Incumbent re-elected.
| rowspan=2 nowrap | 
|-
| William Rodman
|  | Democratic-Republican
| 1810
|  | Incumbent lost re-election.New member elected.Democratic-Republican hold.

|-
! 
| John M. Hyneman
|  | Democratic-Republican
| 1810
| Incumbent re-elected.
| nowrap | 

|-
! 
| William Piper
|  | Democratic-Republican
| 1810
| Incumbent re-elected.
| nowrap | 

|-
! 
| David Bard
|  | Democratic-Republican
| 1802
| Incumbent re-elected.
| nowrap | 

|-
! rowspan=2 | 
| George Smith
|  | Democratic-Republican
| 1808
|  | Incumbent lost re-election.New member elected.Democratic-Republican hold.
| rowspan=2 nowrap | 

|-
| colspan=3 | None (Seat created)
|  | New seat.New member elected.Democratic-Republican gain.

|-
! 
| William Findley
|  | Democratic-Republican
| 1802
| Incumbent re-elected.
| nowrap | 

|-
! 
| Aaron Lyle
|  | Democratic-Republican
| 1808
| Incumbent re-elected.
| nowrap | 

|-
! 
| John Smilie
|  | Democratic-Republican
| 17921794 1798
| Incumbent re-elected.
| nowrap | 

|-
! 
| colspan=3 | None (Seat created)
|  | New seat.New member elected.Democratic-Republican gain.
| nowrap | 

|-
! 
| Abner Lacock
|  | Democratic-Republican
| 1810
| Incumbent re-elected.
| nowrap | 

|}

Rhode Island 

Rhode Island's apportionment was unchanged. Its elections were held August 25, 1812.

|-
! rowspan=2 | 
| Richard Jackson Jr.
|  | Federalist
| 1808
| Incumbent re-elected.
| rowspan=2 nowrap | 

|-
| Elisha R. Potter
|  | Federalist
| 1808
| Incumbent re-elected.

|}

South Carolina 

South Carolina gained one representative as a result of the 1810 census, increasing from 8 seats to 9. Its elections were held October 12–13, 1812.

|-
! 
| Langdon Cheves
|  | Democratic-Republican
| 1810
| Incumbent re-elected.
| nowrap | 

|-
! 
| William Lowndes
|  | Democratic-Republican
| 1810
| Incumbent re-elected.
| nowrap | 

|-
! 
| colspan=3 | None (District created)
|  | New seat.New member elected.Democratic-Republican gain.
| nowrap | 

|-
! 
| colspan=3 | None (District created)
|  | New seat.New member elected.Democratic-Republican gain.
| nowrap | 

|-
! 
| colspan=3 | None (District created)
|  | New seat.New member elected.Democratic-Republican gain.
| nowrap | 

|-
! 
| John C. Calhoun
|  | Democratic-Republican
| 1810
| Incumbent re-elected.
| nowrap | 

|-
! 
| Elias Earle
|  | Democratic-Republican
| 1805 1806 1810
| Incumbent re-elected.
| nowrap | 

|-
! 
| Thomas Moore
|  | Democratic-Republican
| 1800
|  | Incumbent retired.New member elected.Democratic-Republican gain.
| nowrap | 

|-
! 
| colspan=3 | None (District created)
|  | New seat.New member elected.Democratic-Republican gain.
| nowrap | 

|}

Tennessee 

Tennessee's representation increased from 3 seats to 6 as a result of the 1810 census.

Its elections were held April 1–2, 1813, after the term began but before Congress's first meeting.

|-
! 
| John Rhea
|  | Democratic-Republican
| 1803
| Incumbent re-elected.
| nowrap | 

|-
! 
| John Sevier
|  | Democratic-Republican
| 1790 (in North Carolina)1790 1811
| Incumbent re-elected.
| nowrap | 

|-
! 
| colspan=3 | None (District created)
|  | New seat.New member elected.Democratic-Republican gain.The difference between the top two candidates was a single vote. William Kelly unsuccessfully contested the election.

| nowrap | 

|-
! 
| colspan=3 | None (District created)
|  | New seat.New member elected.Democratic-Republican gain.
| nowrap | 

|-
! 
| Felix Grundy
|  | Democratic-Republican
| 1811
| Incumbent re-elected.
| nowrap | 

|-
! 
| colspan=3 | None (District created)
|  | New seat.New member elected.Democratic-Republican gain.
| nowrap | 

|}

Vermont 

Vermont gained two seats after the 1810 census. Rather than re-district, however, Vermont replaced its districts with a single at-large district. It would continue to use an at-large district in 1814, 1816, and 1818, then one more time in 1822 (with 5 seats).

Its elections were held September 1, 1812.

|-
! rowspan=6 | 
| Samuel Shaw
|  | Democratic-Republican
| 1808
|  | Incumbent retired.New member elected.Democratic-Republican hold.
| rowspan=6 nowrap | 

|-
| William Strong
|  | Democratic-Republican
| 1810
| Incumbent re-elected.

|-
| James Fisk
|  | Democratic-Republican
| 18051808 1810
| Incumbent re-elected.

|-
| Martin Chittenden
|  | Federalist
| 1802
|  | Incumbent lost re-election.New member elected.Democratic-Republican hold

|-
| colspan=3 | None (Seat created)
|  | New seat.New member elected.Democratic-Republican gain.

|-
| colspan=3 | None (Seat created)
|  | New seat.New member elected.Democratic-Republican gain.

|}

Virginia 

Virginia gained one seat after the 1810 census, bringing its representation in the House of Representatives to 23 seats, the largest number Virginia would ever have. Virginia went from having the most representatives to having the second-most tied with Pennsylvania. New York, with its 27 seats, surpassed Virginia and remained the most populous state until the late 1960s.

Its elections were held in April 1813, after the term began but before Congress's first meeting.

|-
! 
| Thomas Wilson
|  | Federalist
| 1811
|  | Incumbent lost re-election.New member elected.Democratic-Republican gain.
| nowrap | 

|-
! 
| John Baker
|  | Federalist
| 1811
|  | Incumbent retired.New member elected.Federalist hold.
| nowrap | 

|-
! 
| John Smith
|  | Democratic-Republican
| 1801
| Incumbent re-elected.
| nowrap | 

|-
! 
| William McCoy
|  | Democratic-Republican
| 1811
| Incumbent re-elected.
| nowrap | 

|-
! 
| James Breckinridge
|  | Federalist
| 1809
| Incumbent re-elected.
| nowrap | 

|-
! 
| Daniel Sheffey
|  | Federalist
| 1809
| Incumbent re-elected.
| nowrap | 

|-
! 
| colspan=3 | None (District created)
|  | New seat.New member elected.Federalist gain.
| nowrap | 

|-
! 
| Joseph Lewis Jr.
|  | Federalist
| 1803
| Incumbent re-elected.
| nowrap | 

|-
! 
| John Taliaferro
|  | Democratic-Republican
| 18011803 1811
|  | Incumbent lost re-election.New member elected.Democratic-Republican hold.Incumbent later unsuccessfully challenged the results.
| nowrap | 

|-
! 
| Aylett Hawes
|  | Democratic-Republican
| 1811
| Incumbent re-elected.
| nowrap | 

|-
! 
| John Dawson
|  | Democratic-Republican
| 1797
| Incumbent re-elected.
| nowrap | 

|-
! 
| John Roane
|  | Democratic-Republican
| 1809
| Incumbent re-elected.
| nowrap | 

|-
! 
| Burwell Bassett
|  | Democratic-Republican
| 1805
|  | Incumbent lost re-election.New member elected.Federalist gain.
| nowrap | 

|-
! 
| William A. Burwell
|  | Democratic-Republican
| 1806 
| Incumbent re-elected.
| nowrap | 

|-
! 
| Matthew Clay
|  | Democratic-Republican
| 1797
|  | Incumbent lost re-election.New member elected.Democratic-Republican hold.
| nowrap | 

|-
! 
| John Randolph
|  | Democratic-Republican
| 1799
|  | Incumbent lost re-election.New member elected.Democratic-Republican hold.
| nowrap | 

|-
! 
| James Pleasants
|  | Democratic-Republican
| 1811
| Incumbent re-elected.
| nowrap | 

|-
! 
| Thomas Gholson Jr.
|  | Democratic-Republican
| 1808 
| Incumbent re-elected.
| nowrap | 

|-
! 
| Peterson Goodwyn
|  | Democratic-Republican
| 1803
| Incumbent re-elected.
| nowrap | 

|-
! 
| Edwin Gray
|  | Democratic-Republican
| 1799
|  | Incumbent lost re-election.New member elected.Democratic-Republican hold.
| nowrap | 

|-
! 
| Thomas Newton Jr.
|  | Democratic-Republican
| 1799
| Incumbent re-elected.
| nowrap | 

|-
! 
| Hugh Nelson
|  | Democratic-Republican
| 1811
| Incumbent re-elected.
| nowrap | 

|-
! 
| John Clopton
|  | Democratic-Republican
| 1801
| Incumbent re-elected.
| nowrap | 

|}

Non-voting delegates 

Four territories had delegates in the 13th Congress: Illinois, Indiana, Mississippi, and Missouri. Illinois Territory and Missouri Territory elected their delegates in 1812 for both the end of the 12th and the start of the 13th Congresses.

|-
! 
| colspan=3 | None (District created)
|  | Illinois Territory had been created in 1809, but was not awarded a delegate until 1812.New delegate elected on an unknown date.Democratic-Republican gain.New delegate seated December 3, 1812.
| nowrap | 

|-
! 
| Jonathan Jennings
|  | Democratic-Republican
| 1809
| Incumbent re-elected.
| nowrap | 

|-
! 
| George Poindexter
|  | Democratic-Republican
| 1806
| Incumbent retired.New member elected.
| nowrap | 

|-
! 
| colspan=3 | None (District created)
|  | Missouri Territory was created in 1812 when Louisiana became a state.New delegate elected on an unknown date.Democratic-Republican gain.New delegate seated January 4, 1813.
| nowrap | 

|}

See also 
 1812 United States elections
 List of United States House of Representatives elections (1789–1822)
 1812 United States presidential election
 1812–13 United States Senate elections
 12th United States Congress
 13th United States Congress

Notes

References

Bibliography

External links 
 Office of the Historian (Office of Art & Archives, Office of the Clerk, U.S. House of Representatives)